Speak Easily is a 1932 American pre-Code comedy film starring Buster Keaton, Jimmy Durante, and Thelma Todd, and directed by Edward Sedgwick.  The studio also paired Keaton and Durante as a comedy team during this period in The Passionate Plumber and What! No Beer?  Keaton later used many of the physical gags he created for this film when he wrote (uncredited) gags for the Marx Brothers' A Night At The Opera.

The film is in the public domain, as the copyright was not renewed.

Plot

Professor Post is a shy Classics professor at Potts College, who has lived a sheltered life and has little experience of life outside of academia. Feeling that the professor should see more of the real world, his assistant tricks the professor into thinking that he has inherited $750,000, allowing the professor to leave academia and see the world.

Boarding a train bound for New York City, Prof. Post encounters James, the manager of a dancing troupe that has an engagement in the backwater town of Fish's Switch. The professor becomes infatuated with one of the dancers, Pansy Peets, and accidentally alights at Fish's Switch when attempting to learn her name. He attends a performance by the dancing troupe at the local theatre, and is impressed by their act.

Feeling that the troupe should continue their act, the professor finances the troupe and takes them to perform on Broadway, but only after James insists that the act be improved to a higher standard. Post's suggestions of using inspiration from Ancient Greece are taken on board, with some minor alterations, and the show is turned into a grandiose musical revue. Although Post wishes that Pansy be the leading lady, the show is quickly turned into a star-vehicle for spoiled actress Eleanor Espere, who attempts to win over the professor in order to take total control over both the show and the money it is expected to earn at its debut. Pansy attempts to warn the professor of Eleanor's bad influence, with mixed results.

On the night of the show's debut, James discovers that Prof. Post does not really have the $750,000 he believes to possess and attempts to keep him away from the production for fear of ruining it. The professor stumbles on-stage at several points, amusing the audience who think it to be part of the act, and ensuring the success of the show. However, his antics cause Eleanor to throw a tantrum, and Prof. Post is finally able to admit his love to Pansy.

Cast (in credits order)

Buster Keaton as Professor Post
Jimmy Durante as James
Ruth Selwyn as Pansy Peets
Thelma Todd as Eleanor Espere
Hedda Hopper as Mrs Peets
William Pawley as Griffo
Sidney Toler as Stage Director
Lawrence Grant as Dr Bolton
Henry Armetta as Tony
Edward Brophy as Reno

Home media
Speak Easily exists in several versions on US DVD:  from Alpha Video in 2004, from Synergy Ent. in 2007, from Reel Classics in 2007 and 2008, and in a double-bill with Steamboat Bill, Jr. from East West Entertainment.  The first ever DVD release in the UK is from Powis Square Pictures in January 2009.

External links

 
 
 Speak Easily at the International Buster Keaton Society
 David Beckett review at MyReviewer
 Speak Easily review at Famous Clowns

1932 films
1932 comedy films
American comedy films
American black-and-white films
1930s English-language films
Films directed by Edward Sedgwick
Metro-Goldwyn-Mayer films
Articles containing video clips
1930s American films